The 1905–06 Bucknell Bison men's basketball team represented Bucknell University during the 1905–06 NCAA men's basketball season. The Bison's team captain of the 1905–06 season was G.W. Leach.

Schedule

|-

References

Bucknell Bison men's basketball seasons
Bucknell
Bucknell
Bucknell